Masters W80 discus world record progression is the progression of world record improvements of the discus W80 division of Masters athletics.  Records must be set in properly conducted, official competitions under the standing IAAF rules unless modified by World Masters Athletics.

The W80 division consists of female athletes who have reached the age of 80 but have not yet reached the age of 85, so exactly from their 80th birthday to the day before their 85th birthday. The W80 division now throws a 0.75 kg implement.

Key

References

Masters Athletics Discus list

Masters athletics world record progressions
Discus